HD 92209 (HR 4170) is a probable spectroscopic binary in the southern circumpolar constellation Chamaeleon. It has an apparent magnitude of 6.29, placing it near the max naked eye visibility. Parallax measurements place the system at a distance of 600 light years and is currently receding with a heliocentric radial velocity of almost .

The visible component has a stellar classification of K2 III, indicating that it is a red giant. As a consequence, it has expanded to 14.39 times the radius of the Sun.

References

Chamaeleon (constellation)
K-type giants
Spectroscopic binaries
Chamaeleontis, 22
PD-75 678
092209
051835
4170